Henry Travillion Wingate (born January 6, 1947) is a United States district judge of the United States District Court for the Southern District of Mississippi.

Early life and education
Born in Jackson, Mississippi, Wingate received a Bachelor of Arts degree from Grinnell College in 1969 and a Juris Doctor from Yale Law School in 1972. He was a law clerk for Community Legal Aid in Jackson from 1972 to 1973.

Career
Wingate was in private practice in Jackson in 1973. He was a Lieutenant in the Naval Legal Services Office of the United States Navy from 1973 to 1976, serving as a senior assistant defense counsel from 1973 to 1974 and a trial counsel from 1974 to 1976. He was an adjunct instructor at Golden Gate University School of Law from 1975 to 1976. He was an adjunct lecturer at Tidewater Community College in 1976. He was a special assistant attorney general of the State of Mississippi from 1976 to 1980. He was an adjunct professor at the Mississippi College School of Law from 1978 to 1983. He was an assistant district attorney of the Seventh Circuit Court District, State of Mississippi from 1980 to 1984. He joined the United States Naval Reserve in 1983. He was an Assistant United States Attorney of the Southern District of Mississippi from 1984 to 1985.

Federal judicial service
Wingate was nominated by President Ronald Reagan on September 11, 1985, to the United States District Court for the Southern District of Mississippi, to a new seat created by 98 Stat. 333. He was confirmed by the United States Senate on October 16, 1985, and received his commission on October 17, 1985. He served as Chief Judge from 2003 to 2010.

Judicial backlog
On September 29, 2016, the U.S. Fifth Circuit Court of Appeals removed Wingate as judge from two cases for continued failure to rule upon pending motions. This was not the first time the Court of Appeals had taken notice of Judge Wingate's judicial backlog; in 2010, the higher court criticized him for taking more than six years to issue a final judgment in a civil case.

Notable case
Wingate sentenced Chris Epps, former Mississippi Department of Corrections (MDOC) commissioner, to 325 months (19.7 years) for corruption-related crimes. Wingate cited a burglary incident in which Epps, while on bail, attempted to move material from a Flowood, Mississippi residence he previously gave up to the court, as the reason why Wingate gave a sentence that was longer than the one recommended by prosecutors, 13 years.

See also 
 List of African-American federal judges
 List of African-American jurists

References

Sources

External links
 The Ku Klux Klan in Mississippi (2010), by Michael Newton

1947 births
Living people
20th-century American judges
21st-century American judges
African-American judges
Assistant United States Attorneys
Golden Gate University faculty
Grinnell College alumni
Judges of the United States District Court for the Southern District of Mississippi
United States Attorneys for the Southern District of Mississippi
United States district court judges appointed by Ronald Reagan
United States Navy officers
Yale Law School alumni